This is a list of oven types. An oven is a thermally insulated chamber used for the heating, baking or drying of a substance, and most commonly used for cooking or for industrial processes (industrial oven). Kilns and furnaces are special-purpose ovens. Kilns have historically been used in the production of pottery, quicklime, charcoal, etc., while furnaces are mainly used in metalworking (metallurgical furnace) and other industrial processes (industrial furnace).

Materials; the two basic historical types
Ovens historically have been made by either digging the heating chamber into the earth, or by building them from various materials: 
 Earth ovens, dug into the earth and covered with non-permanent means, like leaves and soil
 Masonry ovens, a term historically used for "built-up ovens", usually made of clay, adobe and cob, stone, and brick.

Modern ovens are made of industrial materials.

Earth ovens
An earth oven, or cooking pit, is one of the most simple and long-used cooking structures. At its simplest, an earth oven is a pit in the ground used to trap heat and bake, smoke, or steam food. Earth ovens have been used in many places and cultures in the past, and the presence of such cooking pits is a key sign of human settlement often sought by archaeologists.  They remain a common tool for cooking large quantities of food where no equipment is available.

Masonry ovens
See below under "Baking ovens", both for masonry oven in general and for various types.

Purpose
Broadly speaking, ovens have always been used either for cooking, prominently for baking; or for industrial purposes – for producing metals out of ores,  charcoal, coke, ceramic, etc.
 Baking ovens
 Industrial devices
 Industrial ovens
 Furnaces such as metallurgical and industrial furnaces
 Kilns

Baking
Baking is a food cooking method that uses prolonged dry heat by convection, rather than by thermal radiation, normally in an oven, but also in hot ashes, or on hot stones. Bread is a commonly baked food.

Industrial

Industrial ovens & furnaces
Industrial ovens are heated chambers used for a variety of industrial applications, including drying, curing, or baking components, parts or final products.  Industrial ovens can be used for large or small volume applications, in batches or continuously with a conveyor line, and a variety of temperature ranges, sizes and configurations.

Coke ovens

Kilns
A kiln is a thermally insulated chamber, a type of oven, that produces temperatures sufficient to complete some process, such as hardening, drying, or chemical changes. Various industries and trades use kilns to harden objects made from clay into pottery, bricks etc. Various industries use rotary kilns for pyroprocessing—to calcinate ores, produce cement, lime, and many other materials.

See also

 Autoclave (industrial)
 Cooker
 Furnace
 Gas Mark
 List of cooking appliances
 List of cooking techniques
 List of home appliances
 List of stoves
 Primitive clay oven
 Redstone Coke Oven Historic District
 Stove

References

Ovens

Technology-related lists